PTCA may refer to:

 Percutaneous transluminal coronary angioplasty, a type of angioplasty
 Percutaneous transhepatic cholangiography